Mexican settlement in the Philippines comprises a multilingual Filipino ethnic group composed of Philippine citizens with Mexican ancestry. The immigration of Mexicans to the Philippines dates back to the Spanish period.

History

Mexican immigration to the Philippines mainly occurred during the Hispanic period. Between 1565-1821, the Philippines were in fact administered from the Viceroyalty of New Spain's capital, Mexico City. During this period trans-Pacific trade brought many Mexicans and Spaniards to the Philippines as sailors, crew, prisoners, slaves, adventurers and soldiers in the Manila-Acapulco Galleons which was the main form of communication between the two Spanish territories. Similarly the route brought various different Filipinos, such as native Filipinos, Spanish Filipinos (Philippine-born Insulares), Chinese Filipinos (See Chinese immigration to Mexico), and other Asian groups to Mexico.

According to Stephanie Mawson in her M.Phil thesis entitled Between Loyalty and Disobedience: The Limits of Spanish Domination in the Seventeenth Century Pacific, in the 1600s there were thousands of Latin American settlers sent to the Philippines by the Spaniards per year and around that time frame the Spaniards had cumulatively sent 15,600 settlers from Peru and Mexico while there were only 600 Spaniards from Spain, that supplemented a Philippine population of only 667,612 people. Due to the initial low population count, people of Latin American and Hispanic descent quickly spread across the territory. The book, "Intercolonial Intimacies Relinking Latin/o America to the Philippines, 1898–1964 By Paula C. Park" citing "Forzados y reclutas: los criollos novohispanos en Asia (1756-1808)" gave a higher number of later Mexican soldier-immigrants to the Philippines, pegging the number at 35,000 immigrants in the 1700s, in a Philippine population which was only around 1.5 Million, thus forming 2.33% of the population. As a result, German ethnographer Fedor Jagor, using Spanish censuses, estimated that one-third of the island of Luzon, which holds half of the Philippine population, had varying degrees of Spanish and Latin American ancestry. Corroborating these Spanish era estimates, an anthropological study published in the Journal of Human Biology and researched by Matthew Go, using physical anthropology, concluded that 12.7% of Filipinos can be classified as Hispanic (Latin American mestizos or Malay-Spanish mestizos), 7.3% as Indigenous American, African at 4.5% and European at 2.7%. Thus, as much as 20% of those sampled bodies, which were representative of the Philippines, translating to about 20 million Filipinos, can be physically classified as Latin American in appearance.

The Philippines and Mexico were part of the Spanish Empire, an experience that left a deep imprint on both societies. Once Spain began its long period of decline in the nineteenth century, the Philippines and Mexico came under the sphere of influence of the emerging power of the north, the United States. According to an opinion piece in La Opinión, Ruben Hernandez Leon describes Mexico being a subordinate and fearful neighbor of American interventions, and the Philippines a Spanish territory subject to the designs of the U.S. federal government.

During the Spanish period, the islands formed part of the Viceroyalty of New Spain, along with other areas of the Pacific Ocean such as the Marianas and the Caroline Islands and during a short period in northern Taiwan. The Spaniards built trade routes from Mexico to the Philippines, primarily from their starting points of Acapulco and Puerto Vallarta, with their final destination being Manila, the current capital of the Philippines. The Spanish ships on these routes were known as the Manila galleons.

Mexican (or rather, New Spaniard) immigrants to the Philippines belonged to different ethnic groups such as indigenous people, mestizos and Creoles who mainly mixed with the local population, which increased the number of descendants with Spanish surnames. The construction of the military fort of Zamboanga used the help of these Mexican immigrants who had already settled in the islands. The Mexican legacy in the Philippines, consisting of marriage between the Spanish and the indigenous culture of origin (Maya and Nahuatl), has been marked in these islands. Many words that originated from Nahuatl, a language spoken by the descendants of the indigenous Mexican Aztecs, have influenced some local languages of the Philippines.

See also

Filipino people of Spanish ancestry
Ethnic groups in the Philippines 
Spanish settlement in the Philippines
Spanish language in the Philippines
Mexico–Philippines relations
Manila galleon
Landing of the first Filipinos
Filipino immigration to Mexico
Mestizos in Mexico
Filipino mestizo
Chamorro people

References

External links
Examination of ancestry and ethnic affiliation using high informations
Color Q world: Asian-Latino Intermarriage in the Americas
"Filipinos in Mexican History" The Manila Bulletin. retrieved 29 January 2005.

Mexico–Philippines relations
Philippines